Daniil Olehovych Davydenko  (born 26 March 2000) is a Ukrainian professional footballer who plays as a left back for Rubikon Kyiv.

Club career
Daniil Davydenko, started his career with Desna-2 Chernihiv, the under-21 side of Desna Chernihiv. He also played in the youth system of Olimpik Donetskl. In 2022 he moved to Rubikon Kyiv in the Ukrainian Second League, where he made his debut against Dinaz Vyshhorod.

References

External links
 
 

2000 births
Living people
Footballers from Kyiv
Piddubny Olympic College alumni
Ukrainian footballers
Association football defenders
FC Arsenal Kyiv players 
FC Desna-2 Chernihiv players
FC Desna Chernihiv players
FC Rubikon Kyiv players
FC Olimpik Donetsk players
Ukrainian Second League players